Charles Seel (April 29, 1897 – April 19, 1980) was an American actor.

He acted in over 30 films from 1938 to 1974 and appeared in over one hundred titles for television from 1952 to 1974. He was also credited as Charles Seal and Charles F. Seel.

Biography
Charles Seel was born in The Bronx, New York, on April 29, 1897. As a young man he worked for the Biograph Studios as a handyman in the wake of the crew. Later, he began acting on stage in vaudeville, then on Broadway, and then in radio before moving to Hollywood in 1937.

He played the old man in the 1971 film, Duel. For television, he played, among others, Otis in five episodes of the television series Tombstone Territory from 1957 to 1958, Doc Miller in two episodes of The Deputy in 1960, newspaper editor Mr. Krinkie in nine episodes of the series Dennis the Menace from 1959 to 1963, Barney Danches in 10 episodes of Gunsmoke from 1965 to 1972 and Tom Pride in 29 episodes of the series The Road West from 1966 to 1967.

His last appearance on the small screen came in the episode The Christmas Party of the television series Apple's Way which aired on December 22, 1974, in which he plays the role of MacPherson, while for the big screen the last film interpretation was in Airport 1975, in which he plays a passenger who is celebrating his anniversary.

Seel died in Los Angeles, California, on April 19, 1980, ten days before his 83rd birthday, and was buried at Forest Lawn Memorial Park in Hollywood Hills.

Selected filmography

Film

 Comet Over Broadway (1938) - Jury Foreman (uncredited)
 Off the Record (1939) - Veterinary (uncredited)
 Blackwell's Island (1939) - Surgeon (uncredited)
 Here Comes Mr. Jordan (1941) - Board Member (uncredited)
 Not Wanted (1949) - Dr. Williams
 The Texas Rangers (1951) - Bartender (uncredited)
 The Man with the Golden Arm (1955) - Proprietor (uncredited)
 I Was a Teenage Frankenstein (1957) - Mr. Sexton, the jeweler
 The Wild and the Innocent (1959) - Trapper (uncredited)
 The Horse Soldiers (1959) - Newton Station Bartender (uncredited)
 It Started with a Kiss (1959) - Stage Doorman (uncredited)
 Pillow Talk (1959) - Antique Dealer (uncredited)
 Please Don't Eat the Daisies (1960) - Upholstery Man (uncredited)
 Pollyanna (1960) - Train Conductor (uncredited)
 Sergeant Rutledge (1960) - Dr. Walter Eckner (uncredited)
 The Dark at the Top of the Stairs (1960) - Percy Weems (uncredited)
 The Walking Target (1960) - Editor (uncredited)
 North to Alaska (1960) - Gold Buyer (uncredited)
 Cimarron (1960) - Charles (uncredited)
 Return to Peyton Place (1961) - Diner Proprietor (uncredited)
 The Honeymoon Machine (1961) - Harvey (uncredited)
 The Second Time Around (1961) - Sam (uncredited)
 The Man Who Shot Liberty Valance (1962) - Election Council President (uncredited)
 Period of Adjustment (1962) - Storekeeper (uncredited)
 Tammy and the Doctor (1963) - Dr. Smithers
 Donovan's Reef (1963) - Grand Uncle Sedley Atterbury Pennyfeather (uncredited)
 The Man from Galveston (1963) - Mr. Steers (uncredited)
 The Tattooed Police Horse (1964) - Ben
 Lady in a Cage (1964) - Mr. Paul, Junkyard Proprietor (uncredited)
 Cheyenne Autumn (1964) - Newspaper Publisher (uncredited)
 Fluffy (1965) - Farmer (uncredited)
 The Great Race (1965) - Freight Agent (uncredited)
 The Chase (1966) - Texan at Party (uncredited)
 Mister Buddwing (1966) - Printer
 Chamber of Horrors (1966) - Rev. Dr. Hopewell
 Where Were You When the Lights Went Out? (1968) - Taxi Driver (uncredited)
 Winning (1969) - Eshovo (uncredited)
 One More Train to Rob (1971, TV Movie) - Reverend 
 Duel (1971) - Old Man
 Sssssss (1973) - Old Man
 Westworld (1973) - Bellhop
 Airport 1975 (1974) - 50th Anniversary Celebrant - Passenger (uncredited)

Television
 Tombstone Territory (1957-1958) - Otis / Bartender
 Bat Masterson (1958) - Bartendar
 The Deputy (1959-1960) - Doc Zach Miller / Doc Miller / Dr. Miller
 Dennis the Menace (1960-1963) - Mr. Krinkie
 Gunsmoke (1961-1974) - Barney Danches / Josiah /Eli
 Hazel (1962 - Season 1 Episode 29 / Chet Cooper
 The Twilight Zone (1962 - Season 3 Episode 19 / Reverend Wood
 The Road West (1966-1967) - Tom Pride
 Apple's Way (1974) - MacPherson

References

External links
 
 
 

1897 births
1980 deaths
American male television actors
Male actors from New York City
People from the Bronx
20th-century American male actors
Burials at Forest Lawn Memorial Park (Hollywood Hills)